Darn Floor - Big Bite is the eighth studio album by Christian alternative rock band Daniel Amos, issued on Frontline Records in 1987. It is their first album following the completion of their ¡Alarma! Chronicles album cycle, and was issued under their shortened moniker Da.

Background
Daniel Amos followed the ¡Alarma! Chronicles four-part album series with this release, the title of which came from an incident involving Koko the gorilla, who had been trained to understand limited amounts of American Sign Language. Koko reacted to an earthquake with the words, "Darn darn floor bad bite. Trouble trouble."

Reissue
Darn Floor - Big Bite was remastered and re-released in 2008 by Arena Rock Recording Co. in conjunction with Stunt Records, featuring additional tracks and bonus material.

Track listing

Side one
 "Return of the Beat Menace" (Words by Taylor, Music by Taylor, Flesch, Chandler) – 2:56
 "Strange Animals" (Words by Taylor, Music by Taylor, Flesch, Chandler) – 3:11
 "Darn Floor - Big Bite" (Words by Taylor, Music by Taylor, Flesch, Chandler) – 4:22 
 "Earth Household" (Words by Taylor, Music by Taylor, Flesch, Chandler) – 3:49
 "Safety Net" (Words by Taylor, Music by Taylor, Flesch, Chandler) – 	3:28

Side two
 "Pictures of the Gone World" (Words by Taylor, Music by Taylor, Flesch, Chandler) – 2:47
 "Divine Instant" (Words by Taylor, Music by Taylor, Flesch, Chandler) – 3:51
 "Half Light, Epoch and Phase" (Words by Taylor, Music by Taylor, Flesch, Chandler) – 4:15
 "The Unattainable Earth" (Words by Taylor, Music by Taylor, Flesch, Chandler) – 3:42
 "The Shape of Air" (Taylor) – 3:25

Deluxe edition bonus disc
 "The Unattainable Earth"
 "Return the Beat Menace"
 "Safety Net" [Live at Cornerstone 1998]
 Interview with Terry Taylor: Concept
 Interview with Terry Taylor: Music with Cassette Demos
 Interview with Terry Taylor: Lyrics
 Interview with Terry Taylor: Recording
 Interview with Terry Taylor: The Band
 Interview with Terry Taylor: Looking Back
 "Pictures of the Gone World"
 "The Shape of Air" [Live at Cornerstone 2000]
 "Half Light, Epoch and Phase"
 "Darn Floor-Big Bite" [Live at Cornerstone 1988]
 "The Unattainable Earth" [Live at Cornerstone 1988]
 "Sacred Heart"

Personnel
 Tim Chandler — bass guitar and backing vocals
 Greg Flesch — lead guitars, pan flute, and squeeze box
 Ed McTaggart — drums and backing vocals
 Terry Scott Taylor — guitars and lead vocals

Additional musicians
 Phil Madeira — lap steel and accordion on live versions of "Safety Net" and "Shape of Air"
 Alex MacDougall — additional percussion
 Andy Prickett — guitar on live version of "Safety Net"
 Background vocals on "The Shape Of Air" — Gene Eugene, Riki Michele, Debi Taylor, Maria Chandler, Mike Stand, Jeff Crandall, Ric Alba, plus those two friends of Gene's

Production notes
 Engineered by Doug Doyle.
 Recorded and Mixed at 3-D Studios, Costa Mesa, California.
 Photography by Ed McTaggart and Dave Perry.
 Video by Dave Perry, Videocon Productions, Costa Mesa, California.
 Cover Concept by Da.
 Original Art Direction and Layout by Ed McTaggart
 Reissue design & layout by Tom Gulotta
 Remastered by Don Tyler
 Reissue Project coordinators: Greg Glover and J. Edward Keyes
 Special Thanks: All of our families, Jason Townsend, Eric Townsend, Rob Gray, Dan De La Isla, Tardon at Mr. Toads.

References

1987 albums
Daniel Amos albums
Frontline Records albums